Chretienella is a genus of moths in the family Gelechiidae. It contains the species Chretienella vaucheri, which is found in Morocco.

References

Gelechiinae